Cooksmill Green is a hamlet in both the civil parish of Roxwell and Highwood in the Chelmsford District of Essex, England. The A414 road is less than one mile to the south.

Cooksmill Green is partly in the civil parish of Highwood at the south, and Roxwell at the north.

Hamlets in Essex
City of Chelmsford